Robert Donovan may refer to:

Robert Donovan (cricketer) (1899–1932), Irish cricketer
Robert J. Donovan (1912–2003), Washington correspondent, author and presidential historian